Andrei Novicov (born 24 April 1986) is a Moldovan footballer who plays as a defender  for Sfântul Gheorghe Suruceni.

References

External links
 

1986 births
Living people
Moldovan footballers
Moldovan Super Liga players
FC Sheriff Tiraspol players
FC Tiraspol players
FC Iskra-Stal players
CSF Bălți players
FC Milsami Orhei players
FC Sfîntul Gheorghe players
Association football forwards